The 2016 Bank of the West Classic was a professional tennis tournament played on hard courts. It was the 45th edition of the tournament, and part of the WTA Premier tournaments of the 2016 WTA Tour. It took place in Stanford, California, United States between 18 and 24 July 2016. It was the first women's event on the 2016 US Open Series.

Points and prize money

Point distribution

Prize money

Singles main-draw entrants

Seeds

 1 Rankings are as of July 11, 2016.

Other entrants
The following players received wildcards into the singles main draw:
  Catherine Bellis 
  Julia Boserup 
  Maria Mateas 
  Carol Zhao

The following players received entry from the qualifying draw:
  Ana Bogdan 
  Elitsa Kostova 
  Asia Muhammad 
  Sachia Vickery

Withdrawals
Before the tournament
  Tímea Babos → replaced by  Verónica Cepede Royg
  Mariana Duque Mariño → replaced by  Jennifer Brady
  Hsieh Su-wei → replaced by  Naomi Osaka
  Daria Kasatkina → replaced by  Kristýna Plíšková
  Anastasia Pavlyuchenkova → replaced by  Urszula Radwańska
  Agnieszka Radwańska → replaced by  Alison Riske
  Lesia Tsurenko → replaced by  Han Xinyun

Retirements
  CoCo Vandeweghe (Right ankle injury)

Doubles main-draw entrants

Seeds

1 Rankings are as of July 11, 2016.

Other entrants 
The following pair received a wildcard into the main draw:
  Yuliya Beygelzimer /  Kristýna Plíšková

Finals

Singles

  Johanna Konta defeated  Venus Williams, 7–5, 5–7, 6–2

Doubles

  Raquel Atawo /  Abigail Spears defeated  Darija Jurak /  Anastasia Rodionova, 6–3, 6–4

References

External links
Official website

 
2016 Bank of the West Classic
Bank of the West Classic
Silicon Valley Classic
Sports in Stanford, California
2016 in sports in California